This is a list of people who were either born or have lived in Brooklyn, a borough of New York City at some time in their lives.

A

 Aaliyah (1979–2001) – actress, dancer and singer
 Cal Abrams (1924–1997) – Major League Baseball player (Madison)
 Monica Aksamit (born 1990), saber fencer; won a bronze medal at the 2016 Summer Olympics in the Women's Saber Team competition.
 Lyle Alzado (1949–1992) – NFL All-Pro football player
 Robert Asencio (born 1963) – Florida politician
 Romeo Alaeff (born 1970) – visual artist
 Marv Albert (born 1941) – sportscaster (Manhattan Beach)
 Tatyana Ali (born 1979) – actress
 Woody Allen (born 1935) – film director, actor and screenwriter (Midwood)
 Franco Ambriz – playwright
 Barbara Anderson (born 1945) – actress
 Carmelo Anthony (born 1984) – National Basketball Association player (Red Hook)
 Alan Arkin (born 1934) – actor, director and screenwriter
 Jack Armstrong (basketball) (born 1963) – sportscaster Toronto Raptors; former coach Niagara University 
 Darren Aronofsky (born 1969) – film director
 Isaac Asimov(1920–1992) – author and biochemist
 Madeline Astor (1893–1970) – Titanic survivor, wife of John Jacob Astor IV
 W.H. Auden (1907–1973) – poet
 Red Auerbach (1917–2006) – National Basketball Association coach and general manager, member of Hall of Fame (Williamsburg)
 Ken Auletta (born 1942) – journalist and writer
 Paul Auster (born 1947) – author (Park Slope)

B 

 John Badalamenti (born 1973) – American federal judge (Gravesend)
 Noah Baumbach (born 1969) – film director and writer 
 Adrienne Bailon (born 1983) – actress
 Scott Baio (born 1960) – actor (Dyker Heights)
 Ralph Bakshi (born 1938) – film director (Haifa, Israel–born and Brownsville-reared)
 Moses Michael Levi Barrow (born Jamal Michael Barrow; 1978), better known by his stage name Shyne, Belizean rapper and politician
 Jean-Michel Basquiat (1960–1988) – artist
 Noah Baumbach (born 1969) – film director and writer (Midwood)
 Gary Becker (1930–2014) – economist; Nobel Memorial Prize in Economic Sciences (1992) (Madison)
 Francis J. Beckwith (born 1960) – philosopher Baylor University
 Henry Ward Beecher (1813–1887) – clergyman and social reformer
 Lyman Beecher (1775–1863) – clergyman and father of Henry Ward Beecher, Thomas K. Beecher and Harriet Beecher Stowe
 Begushkin – folk rock band
 Joy Behar (born 1942) – comedian and talk-show host (Williamsburg)
 Paul Ben-Victor (born 1965) – actor (Midwood)
 Pat Benatar (born 1953) – singer (Greenpoint)
 Randy E. Bennett – educational researcher (Flatbush)
 Mary Crowell Van Benschoten (1840-1921), author, newspaper publisher, clubwoman
 Bill Benulis (1928–2011) – penciller and inker
 David Berkowitz (born 1953) – serial killer known as "Son of Sam"
 Walter Berndt (1899–1979) – cartoonist
 Paul Bettany (born 1971) – actor (Brooklyn Heights)
 Lloyd Blankfein (born 1954) – investment banker; chief executive officer of Goldman Sachs
 Corbin Bleu (born 1989) – actor
 George G. Bloomer (born 1963) – televangelist 
 Emily Blunt (born 1983) – actress
 Joseph Bologna (1934–2017) – actor
 Clara Bow (1905–1965) – actress (Prospect Heights)
 Riddick Bowe (born 1967) – boxer, heavyweight champion (Brownsville)
 Barbara Boxer (born 1940) – politician; U.S. Senator from California (since 1993)
Harry Boykoff (1922–2001) – basketball player
 Steve Bracey (1950–2006) — basketball player
 Scott Brady (1924–1985) – actor
 Mark Breland (born 1963) – boxer; five-time New York Golden Gloves champion
 Shannon Briggs (born 1971) – boxer, heavyweight champion
 Gail Brodsky (born 1991) – tennis player
 Mel Brooks (born 1926) – actor, comedian, film director, film producer and screenwriter (Williamsburg)
 Foxy Brown (born 1978) – actress, model and rap artist (Park Slope)
 Larry Brown (born 1940) – basketball player and coach, point guard, three-time All-Star, three-time assists leader, Olympic champion, NCAA and NBA head coach
 Elliott Buckmaster (1889–1976) – U.S. Navy officer; naval aviator during World War I and World War II
 Buckshot (born 1974) – rapper (Crown Heights)
 Terry Burrus – musician; composer, conductor, producer
 Steve Buscemi (born 1957) – actor, film director and screenwriter
 Busta Rhymes (born 1972) – rapper (East Flatbush and Bedford–Stuyvesant)

C 

 Red Cafe (born 1976) – rapper (Flatbush)
 Charlie Callas (1927–2011) – comedian
 Giovanni Capitello (born 1979) – actor/filmmaker
 Al Capone (1899–1947) – gangster (Red Hook)
Truman Capote (1924–1984) – writer (Brooklyn Heights)
 Jack Carter (1922–2015) – comedian
 Fabiano Caruana (born 1992) – youngest chess grandmaster in United States history (Park Slope)
 Jack Catran (1918–2001) – industrial designer and linguist (Bensonhurst)
 Jasmine Cephas Jones (born 1989) – actress, singer, songwriter 
 George S. Chase (1909–1972) - composer
 Roz Chast (born 1954) – cartoonist
 Bea Chester – All-American Girls Professional Baseball League player
 Shirley Chisholm (1924–2005) – first female African American U.S. Representative and first African American major-party candidate for U.S. President
 Andrew Dice Clay (born 1957) – comedian (Sheepshead Bay)
 Cheryl "Coko" Clemons (born 1970) – gospel singer and lead singer of R&B group SWV
 Abram Cohen (1924–2016) – Olympic fencer
 David Cohen (1917–2020) – member of the US Army, a liberator of the Ohrdruf concentration camp, and a schoolteacher
 Herbert Cohen (born 1940) – Olympic fencer
 Maino (born 1973) – rapper (Bedford–Stuyvesant)
 Norm Coleman (born 1949) – U.S. Senator from Minnesota from 2003 until 2009(Madison)
 Kim Coles (born 1962) – comedienne, actress from Living Single
 Jennifer Connelly (born 1970) – actress (Brooklyn Heights)
 Chuck Connors (1921–1992) – actor
 Omar Cook (born 1982) – professional basketball player
 George H. Cooper (1821–1891) – United States Navy rear admiral 
 Pat Cooper (born 1929) – comedian (Red Hook)
 Aaron Copland (1900–1990) – composer
 Larry Corcoran (1859–1891) – Major League Baseball player
 John Corigliano (born 1938) – Academy Award-, Pulitzer Prize for Music- and Grammy Award-winning composer (Midwood)
 Howard Cosell (1918–1995) – sportscaster
 William R. Cosentini – mechanical engineer and founder of Cosentini Associates 
 Delilah Cotto – dancer, model and actress (Coney Island)
 Jonathan Coulton (born 1970) – musician
 Hart Crane (1899–1932) – poet (The Bridge)
 Melora Creager (born 1966) – singer
 Jimmy Crespo (born 1954) – former Aerosmith guitarist 
 Peter Criss (born 1945) – musician

 Billy Cunningham (born 1942) – NBA player and coach

D 

 Doug E. Doug  (born 1970) comedian 
 Da Beatminerz – hip-hop production team
 Da Bush Babees – hip-hop group (Flatbush)
Matt Damon (born 1970) – actor and screenwriter
 Dana Dane (born 1965) – rapper (Fort Greene)
 Tony Danza (born 1951) – actor
 John D'Aquino (born 1958) – actor
 John Henry Davis (1921–1984) – U.S. weightlifter 6 time world champion and 2 time Olympic gold medalist
 Jonathan David (born 2000) – soccer player
 Thomas Darden (1900–1961) – U.S. Navy Rear admiral, 37th Governor of American Samoa
 Larry David (born 1947) – writer, producer, actor, and comedian (Sheepshead Bay)
 Noach Dear (1953–2020) – New York Supreme Court Judge
 Mos Def (born 1973) – actor and rapper (Bedford–Stuyvesant)
 Ronald DeFeo Jr. (1951–2021) – mass murderer who killed his family in 1974; was the inspiration for The Amityville Horror
 David DeJesus (born 1979) – MLB player
 Dom DeLuise (1933–2009) – comedian and actor
 Alan Dershowitz (born 1938) – lawyer, professor, author (Williamsburg)
 C.C. Deville (Bruce Johannesson) (born 1962) – musician
 Kevin Devine (born 1979) – musician
 Danny Devito (born 1944) - actor, comedian, filmmaker
 Neil Diamond (born 1941) – singer
 Mary E. Dillon (1886 – October 20, 1983) – American engineer and President of Brooklyn Borough Gas Company
 Michael A. DiSpezio (born 1953) – writer, performer, and broadcast host
 Chris DiStefano (born 1984) - comedian
 Vincent D'Onofrio (born 1959) – actor
 Valerie D'Orazio (born 1974) – writer and blogger
 Irvin Dorfman (1924–2006) – tennis player
 David Draiman (born 1973) – singer
 Richard Dreyfuss (born 1947) – actor
Jim Drucker (born 1952/1953) – former Commissioner of the Continental Basketball Association, former Commissioner of the Arena Football League, and founder of NewKadia Comics
 Don Dubbins (1928–1991) – actor
 Lena Dunham (born 1986) – actress and writer (Brooklyn Heights)
 Kyle Bobby Dunn (born 1986) – composer, musician, artist (RAMBO)
 Jimmy Durante (1893–1980) – actor and comedian

E 

 Easy Mo Bee (born 1965) – hip-hop and R&B producer
 William J. Ecker – U.S. Coast Guard Rear Admiral
 Harry Eisenstat (1915–2003) – Major League Baseball player (Madison)
 Erick Arc Elliott (born 1990) – rapper, producer
 The Epochs – rock band, formed in 2002
 Jeffrey Epstein – wealthy businessman and longtime child sex trafficker
 Etika (1990–2019) – YouTuber and online streamer

F 

 Fab 5 Freddy (born 1959) – hip-hop pioneer
 Fabolous (born 1977) – rapper (Bedford-Stuyvesant)
 Edie Falco (born 1963) – actress
 Jimmy Fallon (born 1974) – actor and comedian
 Anthony Fauci (born 1940) – Infectious disease expert, director of NIAD at National Institutes of Health
 Lotta Faust (1880–1910) – musical comedy actress
 Lillian Feickert (1877–1945) – suffragette and politician
 Bob Ferguson (1845–1894) – MLB player ("Death to Flying Things")
 Jerry Ferrara (born 1979) – actor
 Frank Ferrer (born 1966) – Guns N' Roses drummer
 Lou Ferrigno (born 1951) – former bodybuilder, actor (Midwood)
 Martin Fettman (born 1956) – astronaut (Midwood)
 Suzi Ferrer (1940–2006) – US/Puerto-Rican visual artist and feminist
 Ailene Fields (born 1948) – sculptor
 Harvey Fierstein (born 1954) – actor and playwright (Bensonhurst)
 Bobby Fischer (1943–2008) – champion chess player (Flatbush)
Mickey Fisher (1904/05–1963) – basketball coach
 Robert William Fisher (born 1961) – murderer and fugitive (FBI Ten Most Wanted)
 Percy Keese Fitzhugh (1876–1950) – author of children's books
 Rolf G. Fjelde (1926–2002) – playwright, educator and poet
 Farrah Fleurimond – singer-songwriter and member of R&B group Lyric
 James Florio (born 1937) – 49th Governor of New Jersey, 1990 until 1994
Jonathan Safran Foer (born 1977) – novelist
 Cristina Fontanelli – opera singer
 Yuri Foreman (born 1980) – world champion boxer
 John Forsythe (1918–2010) – actor
 Steve Franken (1932–2012) – actor
 Bruce Franklin (born 1934) – professor
 Frank Frazetta (1928–2010) – artist
 Gary William Friedman – composer
 Milton Friedman (1912–2006) – Nobel Prize-winning economist
 Fu-Schnickens – rapper
 Full Force – 1980s R&B and production group

G 

 Eric Gonzalez (born 1969)  politician
 Ellis Gallagher (born 1973) – graffiti artist
 Vincent Gardenia (1920–1992) – actor (Bensonhurst)
 M. Elsa Gardner (1894–1963) – Engineer 
 Ina Garten (born 1948) – Food Network television chef, cookbook author; known as the Barefoot Contessa
 Shad Gaspard (1981–2020) – professional wrestler
 David Geffen (born 1943) – media mogul (Borough Park)
 Sylvia Gerrish (1860–1906) – 19th-century musical comedy performer
 George Gershwin (1898–1937) – composer and younger brother of Ira Gershwin
 Murray Gerstenhaber (born 1927) – mathematician and lawyer
 Deborah Gibson (born 1970) – singer and songwriter
 Taj Gibson (born 1985) – NBA player
 Ruth Bader Ginsburg (1933–2020) – Associate Justice, United States Supreme Court (Madison)
 Johnny Gioeli (born 1967) – singer (Crush 40, Hardline, Axel Rudi Pell)
 Rudy Giuliani (born 1944) – former United States Attorney, former Mayor of New York; 2008 Republican presidential candidate
 Jackie Gleason (1916–1987) – actor and comedian (Bushwick/Bedford–Stuyvesant)
 Marty Glickman (1917–2001) – Olympian and broadcaster (Madison)
 James Newton Gloucester – African-American abolitionist
 Baruch Goldstein (1956–1994) – American-Israel extremist and perpetrator of the 1994 Cave of the Patriarchs massacre 
 Jerry Goldstein (born 1970) – physicist
 Ben Goldwasser (born 1982) – member of the band MGMT
 Norman Gorbaty (1932–2020) – artist
 Sid Gordon (1917–1975) – two-time All-Star baseball player
 Louis Gossett Jr. (born 1936) – Oscar-winning actor (Sheepshead Bay)
 Gilbert Gottfried (1955–2022) – stand-up comedian, actor
 Alfred Gottschalk (1930–2009) – President of Hebrew Union College and leader in the Reform Judaism movement
 Elliott Gould (born 1938) – actor
 Yossi Green (born 1955) – composer
 Dr. George E. Green (born 1932) – cardiac surgeon
 Kai Greene (born 1975) – bodybuilder
 Adrian Grenier (born 1976) – actor (Clinton Hill)
 Bill Griffith (born 1944) – cartoonist (Zippy)
 David Grimm (born 1965) – award-winning playwright and screenwriter
 Leib Groner (1931–2020) –  Chabad-Lubavitch Rabbai and secretary to Menachem Schneerson (Crown Heights)
 Robert Grossman (born 1940) – illustrator
 Bob Guccione (1930–2010) – adult-magazine publisher
 Louise Gunning (1879–1960) – singer, actress
 Sigrid Gurie (1911–1969) – actress
 Arlo Guthrie (born 1947) – singer (Coney Island)
 GZA (born 1966) – rapper (Bedford–Stuyvesant)
 Maggie Gyllenhaal (born 1970) – actress

H 

 Buddy Hackett (1924–2003) – actor and comedian (Williamsburg)
 Adelaide Hall (1901–1993) – jazz singer, songwriter, actress
 Jimmy Hall (born 1994), basketball player in the Israeli National League.
 Bobby Hambel – guitarist, Biohazard
 Marvin Hamlisch (1944–2012) – Oscar-winning composer of film scores (Midwood)
 Andrew P. Harris (born 1957) – Maryland politician
 Barbara Grizzuti Harrison (1934–2002) – author
 Anne Hathaway (born 1982) – Oscar-winning actress
 Knut Haukelid (1911–1994) – Norwegian resistance movement soldier
 Richie Havens (1941– 2013) – folk singer-songwriter, actor; first performer at the original Woodstock (Bedford–Stuyvesant)
 Susan Hayward (1917–1975) – Oscar-winning actress (Flatbush)
 Rita Hayworth (1918–1987) – actress
 Leona Helmsley (1920–2007) – businessperson and real estate investor
 Heltah Skeltah – hip-hop duo (Brownsville)
 Sidney Hertzberg (1922–2005) – pro basketball player
 Robert Hess (artist) (1935–2014) – sculptor
Robert Hess (college president) (1938–1994) – President of Brooklyn College
 Henry Hill (1943–2012) – mobster, subject of Goodfellas
 Russel Hobbs – drummer; member of Gorillaz
 William E. Hoehle – member of the Wisconsin State Assembly
 Steven Hoffenberg – fraudster
 Zander Hollander (1923–2014) – sportswriter, journalist, editor and archivist
 Red Holzman (1920–1998) – Hall of Fame NBA two-time All-Star and coach
 Homicide (born 1977) – ring name of Nelson Erazo, professional wrestler signed to Ring of Honor (Bedford-Stuyvesant)
 Lena Horne (1917–2010) – singer and actress (Bedford–Stuyvesant)
 Curly Howard (Jerome Lester Horwitz; 1903–1952) – comedian; member of The Three Stooges (Brownsville)
 Moe Howard (Moses Harry Horwitz; 1897–1975) – comedian; leader of The Three Stooges (Brownsville)
 Shemp Howard (Samuel Horwitz; 1895–1955) – comedian; member of The Three Stooges (Brownsville)
 William G. Hundley (1925–2006) – criminal defense attorney for high-profile clients, reared in Brooklyn
 Hezekiah Hunter (1837–1894) – teacher, minister, and politician; born in Brooklyn.

I 
 Anthony Ingrassia (1944–1995) – playwright, producer and director
 Jimmy Iovine (born 1953) – entrepreneur, record producer and film producer (Red Hook)
 Breuk Iversen (born 1964) – designer and writer

J 

 Mark Jackson (born 1965) – basketball player
 Cheryl James (born 1966) – rapper and actress
 Shawn James (born 1983) –  basketball player for Maccabi Tel Aviv
 Tama Janowitz (born 1957) – novelist
 Jay-Z (born 1969) – rapper and entrepreneur (Bedford–Stuyvesant)
 Jaz-O (born 1964) – rapper (Bedford–Stuyvesant)
 Charles Jenkins (born 1989) – NBA player
 Jennie Jerome (1854–1921) – Lady Randolph Churchill, mother of Winston Churchill (Cobble Hill)
 Jeru the Damaja (born 1972) – rapper (East New York)
 Joey Badass (born 1995) – rapper
 Evan M. Johnson, US Army brigadier general
 Evan Malbone Johnson (1791–1865)–  clergyman
 Tamara "Taj" Johnson-George (born 1971) – member of R&B group SWV (Bedford–Stuyvesant)
Lamont Jones (born 1972) – basketball player
 Norah Jones (born 1979) – musician, actress
 Susannah Mushatt Jones (1899–2016) – oldest living New Yorker
 E. Bernard Jordan (born 1959) – founder of Zoe Ministries
 Michael Jordan (born 1963) – basketball player
 Zab Judah (born 1977) – professional boxer
 Just-Ice (born 1965) – rapper

K 

 KA (born 1972) – rapper (Brownsville, Brooklyn)
 Meir Kahane (1932–1990) – Orthodox Jewish rabbi, activist and founder of the Jewish Defense League
 Roger Kahn (1927–2020) – sportswriter and author of The Boys of Summer
 Big Daddy Kane (born 1968) – rapper (Bedford–Stuyvesant)
 Eric Kaplan (born 1971) – writer (Flatbush)
 Gabe Kaplan (born 1943) – actor and comedian
KAWS, born Brian Donnelly – graffiti artist, limited-edition clothing and toy designer
 Danny Kaye (1911–1987) – actor and comedian (East New York)
 Lainie Kazan (born 1940) – actress and singer
 Ezra Jack Keats (1916–1983) – author and illustrator
 Monica Keena (born 1979) – actress
 Harvey Keitel (born 1939) – actor
 Steven G. Kellman (born 1947) – author and critic
 Patsy Kelly (1910–1981) – actress
 David M. Kennedy (born 1958) – professor of criminology at John Jay College of Criminal Justice, author of Don't Shoot
 The Kid Gashi (born 1989) – rapper
 Jimmy Kimmel (born 1967) – comedian and television talk-show host
 Bernard King (born 1956) – NBA Hall Of Famer (Fort Greene)
 Carole King (born 1942) – singer-songwriter (Madison)
 Larry King (born 1933–2021) – television talk-show host and interviewer
 Marvin Kitman (born 1929) – television critic, humorist, and author
 Brian Kokoska (born 1988) – artist
 C. Everett Koop (1916–2013) – U.S. Surgeon General
 Sandy Koufax (born 1935) – Hall of Fame baseball pitcher for Brooklyn and Los Angeles Dodgers (Borough Park)
 Martin Kove (born 1946) – actor
 John Krasinski (born 1979) – actor and director
 Talib Kweli (born 1975) – rapper and producer (Park Slope)

L 

 
 Jeffrey Laitman (born 1951) – anatomist
 Pierre Lallement (1843–1891) – inventor
 Abbe Lane (born 1932) – singer, dancer, actress
 Sylven Landesberg (born 1990) – American-Israeli basketball shooting guard (Maccabi Tel Aviv)
 Michael Landon – actor, director, producer
 Dulcinea Langfelder (born 1955) - multidisciplinary artist (drama, dance, song, mime, multimedia)
 Rudy LaRusso (1937–2004) – five-time All-Star NBA basketball player (Madison)
 Reuben Lasker (1929–1988) – marine biologist
 Cyndi Lauper (born 1953) – singer and activist
 Arthur Laurents (1917–2011) – writer and director 
 Steve Lawrence (born 1935) – singer and actor
 Heath Ledger (1979–2008) – actor
 Spike Lee (born 1957) – film director, screenwriter and actor (lived in Fort Greene)
 Roy Lee (born 1969) – film producer
 Shulem Lemmer (born 1990) – singer (Borough Park)
 Ivan Leshinsky (born 1947) – American-Israeli basketball player (Midwood)
 Jonathan Lethem (born 1964) – author (Boerum Hill)
 Andrew Levane (1920–2012) – NBA basketball player (Madison)
 Lewis (alive 1890) – former 19th-century professional baseball player
 Emmanuel Lewis (born 1971) – actor (Midwood)
 Richard Lewis (born 1947) – actor and comedian
 Tillie Ehrlich Lewis (1901–1977) – businesswoman
 Nancy Lieberman (born 1958) – WNBA basketball player, coach and broadcaster; Hall of Fame
 Lil' Kim, born Kimberly Denise Jones (born 1974/1975) – Grammy Award-winning rapper (Bedford–Stuyvesant)
 Lil Mama (born 1989) – rapper
 O. Winston Link (1914–2001) – photographer
 Edie Locke – fashion journalist
 Paul Lo Duca (born 1972) – MLB baseball player
 Robert Logan (born 1941) – actor
 Robert K. Logan (born 1939) – scientist
 "The Brooklyn Brawler" Steve Lombardi (born 1961) – professional wrestler
 Vince Lombardi (1913–1970) – Pro Football Hall of Fame coach (Sheepshead Bay)
 Nia Long (born 1970) – actress
 Jackie Loughery (born 1930) – Miss New York USA 1952, Miss USA 1952
 Mynette Louie – film producer
 Low Ki (born 1979) – ring name of Brandon Silvestry, professional wrestler
 Sid Luckman (1916–1998) – NFL quarterback and Pro Football Hall of Fame
 MC Lyte (born 1970) – actress and rapper

M 

 M.O.P. – hip-hop duo (Brownsville)
 John Buffalo Mailer (born 1978) – playwright and youngest child of author Norman Mailer
 Norman Mailer (1923–2007) – author and playwright
 Paul Malignaggi (born 1980) – boxer (Bensonhurst)
 Barry Manilow (born 1943) – singer-songwriter (Williamsburg)
 Stephon Marbury (born 1977) – NBA player (Coney Island)
 Mario – fictional video-game character
 Marty Markowitz (born 1945) – Borough President of Brooklyn, New York City
 Constantine Maroulis (born 1975) – singer
 Branford Marsalis (born 1960) – saxophonist (Clinton Hill)
 Duane Martin (born 1965) – actor (All of Us)
 George Willard Martin (1886–1971) – mycologist
 Angie Martinez (born 1971) – radio personality, former rapper and actress
 Masta Ace (born 1966) – rapper(Brownsville)
 Maxwell (born 1973) – singer-songwriter, producer, musician (East Brooklyn)
 Lee Mazzilli – American professional baseball player, coach, and manager. Part of the 1986 World Series Champion New York Mets
Joseph McGoldrick (1901–1978) – NYC Comptroller and NY State Residential Rent Control Commissioner, lawyer, and professor
Carson McCullers (1917–1967) – writer
 Amy Upham Thomson McKean (1893–1972) – pianist, songwriter and composer
 Triston McKenzie – professional baseball pitcher for The Cleveland Indians
 Meechy Darko (born 1990) – rapper (Flatbush)
 Romany Malco (born 1968) – actor
 Ronald Mellor (born 1940) – historian
 Boyd Melson (born 1981) – boxer
 Richard Merkin (1938–2009) – painter and illustrator
 Robert Merrill (1917–2004) – opera singer
 Debra Messing (born 1968) – actress
 Sean Michaels (born 1958) – pornographic actor and director
 Thomas Mignone – film director, music video director, screenwriter
 Alyssa Milano (born 1972) – actress
 Arthur Miller (1915–2005) – Pulitzer Prize-winning playwright (Gravesend)
 Henry Miller (1891–1980) – author and raconteur (Williamsburg)
 Jarrell Miller (born 1988) – kickboxer
 Matthew Paul Miller (born 1979) – reggae singer
 Walter Miller (1890–1959) – jockey
 Wentworth Miller (born 1972) – actor
 William J. Millican (1904-1944) – double Navy Cross recipient
 Stephanie Mills (born 1957) – singer (Bedford–Stuyvesant)
 Irv Mondschein (1924–2015) – track and field champion
 Lenny Montana (1926–1992) – actor and professional wrestler
 Mary Tyler Moore (1936–2017) – actor
 Esai Morales (born 1962) – actor
 Ed Morris (1862–1937) – 19th-century MLB pitcher
 Joel Moses (1941–2022) – former provost, MIT (Midwood)
 Mr. Muthafuckin' eXquire (born 1986) – rapper (Crown Heights)
 Chris Mullin (born 1963) – NBA player and executive, Hall of Fame
 Uncle Murda (born 1980) – rapper (East Flatbush)
 Charlie Murphy (1959–2017) – actor and comedian
 Eddie Murphy (born 1961) – actor and comedian

N 

 Boris Nachamkin (1933–2018) – NBA basketball player
 Sam Nahem (1915–2004) – Major League Baseball pitcher
 Larry Namer (born 1948) – founder of E! Entertainment TV networks
 Lia Neal (born 1995) – competitive swimmer and Olympic medalist
 Jack Newfield (1938–2004) – writer
 Mark Newgarden (born 1959) – artist, cartoonist, writer, creator of Garbage Pail Kids, author of We All Die Alone and How to Read Nancy (Williamsburg)
 Ed Newman (born 1951) – NFL All-Pro football player
 Harry Nilsson (1941–1994) – singer-songwriter (Bushwick)
 Joakim Noah (born 1985) – NBA basketball player
 Peggy Noonan (born 1950) – author, columnist
 The Notorious B.I.G. (1972–1997) – rapper, born Christopher George Latore Wallace; Biggie, Biggie Smalls

Lupita Nyong'o (born 1983) – actress

O 

 O.C. (born 1971) – rapper (Bushwick)
 Henry Obst (1906–1975) – football player
 Tasker Oddie (1870–1950) – 12th Governor of Nevada and a United States Senator; born in Brooklyn
 Dennis J. Patrick O'Grady (1943-1972) – Florida state senator
 Ol' Dirty Bastard (1968–2004) – rapper (Fort Greene)
 Originoo Gunn Clappaz – hip-hop group (Brownsville)
 Dave Orr (1859–1915) – born in Brooklyn, MLB player
 Joell Ortiz (born 1980) – rapper and producer (Williamsburg)

 Adam Ottavino (born 1985) – MLB pitcher for the New York Yankees

P 
 Peter Pace (born 1945) – Chairman of the Joint Chiefs of Staff
 Shemuel Pagan (born 1988) – professional boxer
 Papoose (born 1978) – rapper
 Joseph Papp (1921–1991) – theatrical impresario who created New York City's Public Theater
 Lana Parrilla (born 1977) – actress
 Ben Parris (born 1961) – author
 Joe Paterno (1926–2012) – football coach at Penn State in College Football Hall of Fame
 Angela Paton (1930–2016) – theatre, TV and film actress
 Jayson Paul (born 1984) – professional wrestler
 Dickey Pearce (1836–1908) – MLB player
Nelson Peltz (born 1942) – billionaire businessman and investor
 Rosie Perez (born 1964) – actress and choreographer (Bushwick and later Clinton Hill)
 Rhea Perlman (born 1948) – actress
 Harold Perrineau (born 1963) – actor
 Lip Pike – home run champion baseball player
 Michael Pitt (born 1981) – actor and musician
 Stacey Plaskett (born 1966) – politician and attorney
 Suzanne Pleshette (1937–2008) – actress (Brooklyn Heights)
 Mark F. Pomerantz (born 1951) - attorney, prosecutor 
 Martin Pope (1918–2022) – physical chemist
 Charles Millard Pratt (1855–1935) – oil industrialist and philanthropist
 Frederic B. Pratt (1865–1945) – president of Brooklyn's Pratt Institute (1893–1937)
 George Dupont Pratt (1869–1935) – conservationist and philanthropist
 Harold Pratt (1877–1939) – oil industrialist
 Herbert L. Pratt (1871–1945) – oil industrialist
 John Pratt (1873–1927) – lawyer, philanthropist, music impresario and financier
 Marianne Preger-Simon (born 1929) - dancer, choreographer, writer, and psychotherapist
 DJ Premier (born 1966) – hip-hop disc jockey, producer, co-founder and member of hip-hop duo Gang Starr
 Priscilla Presley (born 1945) - businesswoman, actress
 Sean Price (1972–2015) – rapper (Brownsville)

R 

 Eddie Rabbitt (1941–1998) – singer-songwriter
 Marky Ramone (born 1956) – drummer of the punk band The Ramones
 Anthony Ramos (born 1991) – actor, singer-songwriter 
 Lou Reed (1942–2013) – singer-songwriter
 Paul Regina (1956–2006) – actor
 Leah Remini (born 1970) – actress (Bensonhurst)
 Bebe Rexha (born 1989) – singer-songwriter and record producer 
 Buddy Rich (1917–1987) – drummer and big-band leader
 Adam Richman – actor, host of reality-television series Man vs. Food
 Thomas Ridgway, U.S. Army officer and father of General Matthew Ridgway
 Joan Rivers (1933–2014) – comedian
 Phil Rizzuto (1917–2007) – Major League Baseball player and broadcaster
 Mary Fanton Roberts (1864–1956) – journalist, writer
 Jackie Robinson – Major League Baseball player and pioneer, Brooklyn Dodgers
 Chris Rock (born 1965) – actor and comedian (Bedford–Stuyvesant)
 Tony Rock (born 1974) – actor and comedian (Bedford–Stuyvesant)
 Steve Rogers (born 1920) – American hero, federal official, intelligence operative, former soldier
 Saul Rogovin (1923–1995) – Major League Baseball pitcher
 Mickey Rooney (1920–2014) – five-time Oscar-nominated actor
 Mike Rosen (born 1944) – radio talk show host and newspaper columnist
Aaron "Rosy" Rosenberg (1912–1979) – two-time "All-American" college football player, and film and television producer 
 Wayne Rosenthal (born 1965) – Major League Baseball pitcher and coach (Canarsie)
 Steve Ross (1927–1992) – chairman of Time Warner
 Mark Roth (born 1951) – bowler
 Rowdy Rebel (born 1991) – rapper from GS9 (East Flatbush)
Ed Rubinoff (born 1935) - tennis player
 David Ruggerio (born 1962) – chef
 Brenda Russell (born 1949) – singer
 Chris Rush (born 1946) – stand-up comedian
 Sam Rutigliano (born 1933) – football coach
 Carl Hancock Rux – writer, actor, and director (Fort Greene)
 RZA (born 1969) – rapper

S 

 Peter Sarsgaard (born 1971) – actor
 Carl Sagan (1934–1996) – scientist, author, educator (Bensonhurst)
 Saigon (born 1977) – actor and rapper
 Stephanie Saland – ballet dancer and teacher
 Dmitri Salita (born 1982) – boxer
 Bernie Sanders (born 1941) – Independent U.S. Senator from Vermont (Madison)
 Adam Sandler (born 1966) – actor and comedian
 Evie Sands (born 1946) – singer-songwriter and musician
 Roger Schank (born 1946) – education reformer, artificial-intelligence expert
 Kenny Scharf (born 1958) – graffiti artist
 Ossie Schectman (1919–2013) – NBA basketball guard
 Thomas D. Schiano (born 1962) – organ-transplantation specialist
 Vincent Schiavelli (1948–2005) − actor, food writer
 Steve Schirripa (born 1957) – actor (Bensonhurst)
 Andre-Michel Schub (born 1952) – pianist (Midwood)
 Chuck Schumer (born 1950) – U.S. Senator from New York (Flatbush)
 Gary Schwartz (born 1940) – art historian
 Seymour Schwartzman (1930–2009) – opera singer and cantor
 Raymond Scott (born Harry Warnow, 1908–1994) – composer, bandleader, pianist, electronic-music pioneer
 Neil Sedaka (born 1939) – singer-songwriter
 Alonzo Bertram See (1849–1941) – businessman
 Erich Segal (1937–2010) – author, Academy Award-nominated screenwriter, and educator (Midwood)
 Jerry Seinfeld (born 1954) – actor and comedian (Borough Park)
 Hubert Selby, Jr. (1928–2004) – author
 Cletus Seldin (born 1986) – boxer
 Phil Sellers (born 1953) – former NBA player
 Greg Serano (born 1974) – actor
 Shabazz the Disciple (born 1973) – rapper (Red Hook)
 Ruth Shafer (1912 –1972) – engineer
 Judy Shapiro-Ikenberry (born 1942) – long-distance runner
 Neal Shapiro (born 1945) – equestrian and Olympic medalist
 Francis Ethelbert Sharkey – fictional character played by Terry Becker in the 1964–68 ABC television series Voyage to the Bottom of the Sea
 Judith Sheindlin (born 1942) – television personality, Judge Judy (Madison / Bedford–Stuyvesant)
 Allie Sherman (1923–2015) – NFL player and coach
 Art Sherman (born 1937) – horse trainer and jockey
 Bobby Shmurda (born 1994) – rapper from GS9 (East Flatbush)
 Michael Showalter (born 1970) – actor and comedian
 Gabourey Sidibe (born 1983) – actress (Bedford–Stuyvesant)
 Bugsy Siegel (1906–1947) – gangster
 Raymond Siller (born 1939) – television writer, political consultant
 Beverly Sills (1929–2007) – opera singer
 Dean Silvers – film director, film producer, screenwriter, and author (East Flatbush)
 Phil Silvers (1911–1985) – actor and comedian
 David Sive (1922–2014) – attorney, environmentalist, and professor of environmental law
 Skoob – half of rap duo Das EFX
 Justine Skye (born 1995) – singer-songwriter, dancer and model
 Smif-n-Wessun – hip-hop duo
 Jimmy Smits (born 1955) – actor
 Pop Smoke (1999–2020) from Canarsie – rapper
 Ralph Snyderman (born 1940) – physician, scientist, administrator (Bensonhurst)
 Robert Solow (born 1924) – economist; winner of the Nobel Memorial Prize in Economic Sciences (Madison)
 paul Sorvino (Born 1939–2022) – Actor
 Carl Søyland (1894–1978) – editor-in-chief of Nordisk Tidende
 Paul Spatola – musician
 DJ Spinderella (born 1971) – DJ and rapper
 Barbara Stanwyck (1907–1990) – Oscar-winning actress
 Peter Steele (1962–2010) – bassist and singer (Type O Negative, Carnivore) (Midwood)
 Gary Stephan (born 1942) – artist
 Lance Stephenson (born 1990) – basketball player
 Stuart Sternberg (born 1959) – owner of the Tampa Bay Rays
 Connie Stevens (born 1938) – actress and singer
 Neil M. Stevenson (1930–2009) – Chief of Chaplains of the U.S. Navy
 Sticky Fingaz (born 1973) born Kirk Jones – of the rap group Onyx
 Jerry Stiller (1927-2020) – actor, father of Ben Stiller
 David Stones (born 1988) – rapper
 Barbra Streisand (born 1942) – Oscar-winning actress, singer, director, political activist (Williamsburg)
 Eric Stuart (born 1967) – voice actor, voice director, musician, singer and songwriter
 Ray Suarez (born 1957) – journalist (Bensonhurst)
Jason Sudeikis (born 1975) – actor and comedian (Clinton Hill)
 Harold Syrett (1913–1984) – President of Brooklyn College

T 

 Sid Tannenbaum (1925–1986) – professional basketball player
 Tazz (born 1967) – ring name of Peter Senerchia, former professional wrestler
 Sebastian Telfair (born 1985) – NBA player
 Roy M. Terry (1915–1988) – Chief of Chaplains of the U.S. Air Force
 Tanisha Thomas (born 1985) – reality television participant, television show host
 Adrianne Tolsch (1938–2016) – Comedian, writer and graphic artist 
 Marisa Tomei (born 1964) – Oscar-winning actress
 Joe Torre (born 1940) – Major League Baseball player, New York Yankees and Los Angeles Dodgers manager, Hall of Fame (Marine Park)
 Rachel Trachtenburg (born 1993) – actress, singer, musician (Bushwick)
 Richard Tucker (1884–1942) – actor
 Mark Turenshine (1944–2016) – American-Israeli basketball player
 John Turturro (born 1957) – actor and director
 Nicholas Turturro (born 1962) – actor 
 Kathy Troccoli (born 1955)  singer gospel
 Mike Tyson (born 1966) – heavyweight boxing champion

U 

 Uncle Murda (born 1980) – gangster rapper (East New York)
 UTFO – 1980s rap group

V 

 Lou Vairo (born 1945) – ice hockey coach and inductee into the United States Hockey Hall of Fame
 Andrew VanWyngarden (born 1983) – member of MGMT
 Alan Veingrad (born 1963) – NFL player
 Guido Verbeck (1830–1898) –  political advisor, educator, and missionary
 Edward Vick (born 1944) – former CEO of Young & Rubicam
 Idara Victor – actress
 Tony Visconti (born 1944) – musician, producer
 Abe Vigoda – actor

W 

 Kaci Walfall (born 2004) – actress
 Eli Wallach (1915–2014) – actor
 Shatzi Weisberger (1930–2022) – nurse, activist, and death educator
 Mickey Welch (1859–1941) – MLB player
 Mae West (1893–1980) – actress, playwright, and comedian (Williamsburg/Greenpoint)
 Randy Weston (1926–2018) – pianist and composer 
 Colson Whitehead (born 1969) – novelist and MacArthur Fellow
 Walt Whitman (1819–1892) – poet, best known for Leaves of Grass; journalist and Brooklyn Eagle editor; essayist and humanist
 Whodini – 1980s rap group
 Olivia Wilde (born 1984) – actress (Clinton Hill)
 Michael K. Williams (1966-2021) – actor
 Michelle Williams (born 1980) – actress
 Jan Wilsgaard (1930–2016) – chief automotive designer, Volvo Cars, 1950–1990
 Robert Anton Wilson (1932–2007) – author
 Shelley Winters (1920–2006) – Oscar-winning actress
 Paula Wolfert (born 1938) – cookbook author, specialist in Mediterranean cuisines
 Wolfman Jack (1938–1995) – 1970s disc jockey
 BD Wong (born 1960) – actor (Bedford Stuyvesant)
 Lloyd R. Woodson (born 1966) – arrested in 2010 with military-grade weapons and a detailed map of the Fort Drum military installation
 Harold G. Wren (1921–2016) – dean of three law schools
 Timothy Weah (born. 2000) – soccer player

Y 

 Adam Yauch (1964–2012) – rapper, founding member of the Beastie Boys
 Janet Yellen (born 1946) – economist and U.S. secretary of the treasury
 Henny Youngman (1906–1998) – comedian

Z 
 Max Zaslofsky (1925–1985) – NBA guard/forward, one-time FT% leader, one-time points leader, All-Star, ABA coach
 Zombie Juice (born 1990) – rapper (Flatbush)
 Shirley Zussman (1914–2021) – sex therapist 
 Shlomo Zev Zweigenhaft (1915–2005) – rabbi

See also

 List of artists who have resided in Brooklyn
 List of people from New York City
 List of people from the Bronx
 List of people from Queens
 List of people from Staten Island

References

Brooklyn, New York
Brooklyn
People